Belle Vue railway station serves the area of Belle Vue, Manchester, England.

History

The station was built by the Sheffield and Midland Railway Companies' Committee and opened on 1 September 1875. It was located on the line between New Mills and Manchester London Road (now Piccadilly).

A joint venture of the Manchester, Sheffield and Lincolnshire Railway and the Midland Railway, it was a shorter route than the already existing one through Hyde Junction, and was used by the latter's main line expresses from London until 1880, when they began running via Stockport Tiviot Dale into Manchester Central

It was popular with visitors to Belle Vue Zoological Gardens, set up by John Jennison in 1836. After the zoo's closure in the early 1980s, usage of the station plummeted. All that remains of the original station is that part of the footbridge which crosses the running lines.

Facilities

The original station had four platforms. The main building with booking office and parcels office was located on the west side of the railway and the platforms were linked by a raised footbridge.

Only two platforms remain in 2017, whilst there are no surviving buildings present other than standard waiting shelters on each platform.  Train running information is offered via timetable posters and telephone.  No step-free access available, as entry and exit on both sides is via a pair of stepped ramps from the main road.

Services

There is no Sunday service.

References and bibliography

Butt, R.V.J., The Directory of Railway Stations, 1995, Patrick Stephens Ltd,

External links

Railway stations in Manchester
DfT Category F2 stations
Former Great Central and Midland Joint Railway stations
Railway stations in Great Britain opened in 1875
Northern franchise railway stations